Ioan Gruffudd (born 6 October 1973) is a Welsh actor. He first came to public attention as Fifth Officer Harold Lowe in Titanic (1997), and then for his portrayal of Horatio Hornblower in the Hornblower series of television films (1998–2003). Subsequent roles have included Lancelot in King Arthur (2004), Reed Richards / Mister Fantastic in Fantastic Four (2005) and its 2007 sequel, William Wilberforce in Amazing Grace (2006), and Tony Blair in W. (2008).

His other film credits include 102 Dalmatians (2000), Black Hawk Down (2001), The Gathering (2003), Fireflies in the Garden (2008), The Secret of Moonacre (2008), Sanctum, Horrible Bosses, Foster (all 2011), The Adventurer: The Curse of the Midas Box (2014), and San Andreas (2015).

On television, Gruffudd has starred in the CW series Ringer (2011–2012), the ABC drama Forever (2014–2015), the Lifetime series UnReal (2016), Sundance/ITV's Liar (2017–2020), and the Australian series Harrow (2018–2021).

Early life and education
Gruffudd was born on 6 October 1973 in Aberdare, the eldest of three siblings. His parents, Gillian (née James) and Peter Griffiths (Ioan uses Gruffudd, the more traditional Welsh version of the surname), were both teachers.

His father was headmaster at two Welsh-language comprehensive schools in South Wales, first at Ysgol Gyfun Llanhari (in Llanharry, Rhondda Cynon Taf) then later at Ysgol Gyfun Rhydfelen (in Rhydfelin). He has a brother, Alun, two years younger, and a sister, Siwan, who is seven years his junior. The Gruffudd siblings were raised in a Protestant non-conformist household.

During his childhood, his family moved to Cardiff. Gruffudd attended Ysgol Gynradd Gymraeg Aberdar (Ynyslwyd; now located in Cwmdare), Ysgol Gymraeg Melin Gruffydd (in Whitchurch, Cardiff), and Ysgol Gyfun Gymraeg Glantaf (in Llandaff North).

He was an accomplished oboist in his teens, achieving a Grade 8 level in the ABRSM music examinations and playing in the South Glamorgan Youth Orchestra for several years, but gave it up once acting took up most of his time. He won prizes for his high baritone singing while at school, including one at the National Eisteddfod. He has said, "As a Welshman, I grew up in a culture of singing and performing with music, and I think it was through this performing that I got my confidence as an actor."

Gruffudd's parents are committed Christians, and in his early 20s he was a member of the London Church of Christ, but his mother later came to London to "sort [his] head out". In June 2007, he said that he "wouldn't describe myself as a deeply religious man".

Career

Gruffudd started his acting career at the age of 13 in a Welsh television film, Austin (1986), and later moved on to the Welsh language soap opera Pobol y Cwm (People of the Valley) from 1987 to 1994. He also played football with the Pobol y Cwm football team Cwmderi FC alongside co-stars Hywel Emrys, Gwyn Elfyn and Ieuan Rhys. During this time, he was also active on stage, in-school performances, and in the 1991 Urdd Eisteddfod production of Cwlwm.

In 1992, aged 18, he began attending the Royal Academy of Dramatic Art (RADA) in London. However, he was only given small parts in the academy's productions, and feeling isolated and directionless, almost dropped out several times. But in 1995, while in his final year, he was cast in Ibsen's Hedda Gabler as George (Jörgen) Tesman, the husband of Hedda, the lead character. This performance led to his being offered the role of Jeremy Poldark in the 1996 TV remake of Poldark.

After playing Oscar Wilde's lover John Gray in 1997's Wilde he took a role as Fifth Officer Harold Lowe in James Cameron's film Titanic. He later landed the role of Horatio Hornblower in Hornblower, the Meridian production of the C. S. Forester novels (1998–2003), shown on ITV and A&E. He has said: "It was quite something for an unknown actor to get the lead. So I will always be grateful to Hornblower. ... I would love to play this character through every stage of his life. I think it would be unique to have an actor playing him from the very early days as a midshipman, through till he's an Admiral. So, I would love to play this character till he perishes."

His television work includes playing the character Pip in the BBC TV production of Charles Dickens' Great Expectations (1999), Lt. John Feeley in BBC One's Warriors (1999) and architect Philip Bosinney in ITV's adaptation of The Forsyte Saga (2002). He has starred in the films 102 Dalmatians (2000), Black Hawk Down (2001) and King Arthur (2004).

In 2007, he starred in the historical drama Amazing Grace as William Wilberforce, the British abolitionist, receiving critical acclaim for the role. Gruffudd has also portrayed characters of both Marvel Comics and DC Comics, having appeared as Reed Richards / Mister Fantastic in Marvel's Fantastic Four (2005) and Fantastic Four: Rise of the Silver Surfer (2007), and provided the voice of Mister Miracle in DC's Justice League Unlimited (2004–06).

In 2008, he appeared in the Julia Roberts-Ryan Reynolds film, Fireflies in the Garden. In 2008, he also appeared in The Secret of Moonacre. In 2009, he starred alongside Josh Brolin in W., a biopic about the life of US President George W Bush, in which Gruffudd played Tony Blair. In 2011, he played the financier of a cave dive in Sanctum.

Gruffudd débuted his new male lead of Dr Andrew Earlham, a respected surgeon and widowed father of a teenage son, on 11 September 2017, in ITV's new 6-part thriller miniseries, Liar. Dr Earlham's world—personally and professionally—is torn asunder when his son's schoolteacher, Laura Neilson (Joanne Froggatt) accuses him of raping her after their first date, the details of which she cannot remember. Liar also began airing in the US on SundanceTV on 25 September 2017.

In 2018, Gruffudd was cast as forensic pathologist Dr. Daniel Harrow in the Australian TV show Harrow airing on the ABC. The show is set and filmed in Brisbane and focuses on Gruffudd's character Dr. Harrow - a forensic pathologist with a total disregard for authority, and an unfailing empathy for the dead which helps him to solve the most bizarre cases. The series was a ratings hit in Australia and overseas, and was renewed for a second series in 2019 and a third series in 2020.

Apart from television and film work, he starred in the music video of Westlife's version of "Uptown Girl" (2001) alongside Claudia Schiffer. On 7 July 2007 he was a presenter at the UK leg of Live Earth at Wembley Stadium, London.

Gruffudd is a native Welsh speaker. He was inducted into the Gorsedd Beirdd Ynys Prydain (the Bardic Order of Great Britain) at the highest rank of druid in the National Eisteddfod at Meifod, mid-Wales, on 4 August 2003, with the bardic name "Ioan".

In July 2008, he featured in a promotional trailer in Welsh for BBC Wales, alongside fellow Welshmen Matthew Rhys and Gethin Jones, publicising BBC coverage of the 2008 National Eisteddfod of Wales in Cardiff. In early 2014, Gruffudd was among the stars of Wales in a short film from the BBC to mark the centenary of the birth of Welsh poet Dylan Thomas.

Personal life
On 14 September 2007, he married actress Alice Evans, whom he met during the production of 102 Dalmatians. 

Gruffudd's best man at the wedding was fellow Welsh actor Matthew Rhys, his long-time friend.  Both are patrons of Trust PA, a UK spinal injuries charity.

Gruffudd and Evans have two daughters, born in 2009 and 2013. Evans announced the couple's separation in January 2021. On 1 March 2021, Gruffudd filed for divorce. 

On 14 February 2022, Gruffudd filed for a domestic violence restraining order against Evans. This included the protection of his girlfriend Bianca Wallace. On 2 August 2022, Gruffudd was granted a three-year permanent domestic violence restraining order against Evans.

Filmography

Film

Video games

Television

Theatre

Music video

Sources
Some information in this table was obtained from Ioan Gruffudd CV.

References

Bibliography

External links

 
 
 

1973 births
Alumni of RADA
Bards of the Gorsedd
Living people
People educated at Ysgol Gyfun Gymraeg Glantaf
Male actors from Cardiff
People from Aberdare
Welsh Christians
British Christians
Welsh male film actors
Cool Cymru
British male soap opera actors
British male stage actors
Welsh male television actors
British male video game actors
Welsh male voice actors
British expatriates in the United States
Naturalized citizens of the United States
Welsh-speaking actors
20th-century British male actors
21st-century British male actors